La ballade de Titus is a 1997 French comedy film, directed by Vincent De Brus.

Plot
Burlesque fable addressing a serious subject : the right to difference through the adventures of Titus from a young age was locked in the basement by his adoptive parents with only companions a television, a VCR and five hundred cartoons cassettes. We find him twenty years later in the clinic of the terrible Dr. Schrink. But there, thwarting the plans of the wicked, he meets the love and glory soon.

Cast

 Michel Courtemanche as Titus
 Jean-Claude Dreyfus as Doctor Shrink
 Catherine Jacob as Louise
 Natacha Lindinger as Jeanne
 Antoine Duléry as Monsieur Marsan
 Myriam Moszko as Madame Marsan
 Sylvie Lachat as Josiane Médiocre
 Patrick Paroux as Delile
 Christian Pereira as Rouget
 Marie-Christine Adam as The Minister
 Suzanne Drouet as The Secretary
 Macha Model as The Journalist

Production 
The movie was first released in Germany, 17 July 1997, and then in France, 15 July 1998.

References

External links

1997 films
1990s French-language films
1997 comedy films
French comedy films
1998 comedy films
1998 films
1990s French films